Stormer or Störmer may refer to:

Alvis Stormer, a military armored vehicle, built in several variants: 
 Stormer HVM  (equipped with High Velocity Missile (HVM))
 Flat bed Stormer (used to carry a minelaying system)
 A Stormer with Shielder system
 Stormer (band), an American hard rock band
 Störmer (crater), a lunar crater
 Stormers (rugby club), a South African rugby team
 Størmer's theorem, in number theory
 Land Rover Range Stormer, a concept car manufactured by Ford
The Daily Stormer, an American neo-Nazi website

People
John A. Stormer (1928-2018), American writer
Carl Størmer (1874–1957), Norwegian physicist and mathematician
Erling Størmer (born 1937), Norwegian mathematician
Fredrik Størmer (disambiguation), multiple people
Horst Ludwig Störmer (born 1949), German physicist
Leif Størmer (1905–1979), Norwegian paleontologist and geologist
Mark Stoermer (born 1977), American musician

Fiction
Stormer, a character on the television series Jem
Preston Stormer, a character from the LEGO theme and television series, Hero Factory.

Disambiguation pages with surname-holder lists